Plazma (Serbian Cyrillic: Плазма) is a brand of soft biscuits owned by Bambi A.D. It was introduced in 1967 in Serbia as a cheaper and more widely available alternative to Plasmon, or a direct competitor to Petit Beurre made by Kraš. It is also known as Lane in Western Europe and the Americas since the 1990s.

History 

Following the acquisition of the Italian-based Plasmon Society by Heinz, mass layoffs occurred at the factories which operated at the time, with one of the workers laid-off, Petar Tutavac (1934–2022), deciding to return to his native hometown of Požarevac and setting in motion the foundation of the Serbian food company Bambi a.d. and the creation of its popular Plazma biscuits in 1967 and 1968 respectively, sold as Lane biscuits outside of former Yugoslavia to avoid further litigation from Heinz.

This origin story however has been disputed by Bambi's founder, Momčilo Filipović, who explained in an interview how Plazma's creation stemmed from his ambition to expand Leskovac’s wheat mill into biscuit production, an idea which was not met with much enthusiasm by the city, which wanted to develop its more traditional textiles industry instead. After acquiring the rights and technology from Italian producers after lengthy negotiations, Bambi was set up in Požarevac, and Tutovac, in actuality a master-baker from a small biscuit factory in Croatia, was brought on board, only to rise up to become the technical director.

Varieties 

There have been in total 20 Plazma varieties, of which 9 have been discontinued.

Explanatory notes

References 

1967 introductions
Biscuits